Waterloo Bridge is a road and foot traffic bridge crossing the River Thames in London.

Waterloo Bridge may also refer to:

 Waterloo Bridge, Betws-y-Coed, a bridge over the River Conwy in Wales
 Waterloo Bridge (play), by Robert E. Sherwood, 1930
 Waterloo Bridge (1931 film), based on the play, starring Mae Clarke
 Waterloo Bridge (1940 film), based on the play, starring Vivien Leigh and Robert Taylor
 Gaby (film), a 1956 film based on the play
 Waterloo Bridge (Monet series), a series of paintings of Waterloo Bridge, London, by Claude Monet

See also

Waterloo (disambiguation)
 Waterloo Bridge Helmet, a pre-Roman Celtic bronze ceremonial horned helmet
 First Battle of Rappahannock Station, also known as Waterloo Bridge, an American Civil War battle